Zamia paucijuga is a species of plant in the cycad family Zamiaceae.

The cycad is endemic to southwestern and western Mexico.  It is widely distributed along the Pacific Coast of Mexico and also on Maria Cleofas island. It is found in the states of Chiapas, Colima, Guerrero, Jalisco, Michoacán, Nayarit and Oaxaca.

It is threatened by habitat loss.

References

paucijuga
Endemic flora of Mexico
Flora of Chiapas
Flora of Colima
Flora of Guerrero
Flora of Jalisco
Flora of Michoacán
Flora of Nayarit
Flora of Oaxaca
Near threatened biota of Mexico
Taxonomy articles created by Polbot